Silbestre Álvarez Ramón (born 12 August 1967) is a Mexican politician from the Party of the Democratic Revolution. From 2006 to 2009 he served as Deputy of the LX Legislature of the Mexican Congress representing Tabasco. He also served as a local deputy in the LVIII Legislature of the Congress of Tabasco and as municipal president of Nacajuca.

References

1967 births
Living people
Politicians from Tabasco
Institutional Revolutionary Party politicians
21st-century Mexican politicians
Municipal presidents in Tabasco
Members of the Congress of Tabasco
Mexican judges
Deputies of the LX Legislature of Mexico
Members of the Chamber of Deputies (Mexico) for Tabasco